Enteropathic arthropathy or enteropathic arthritis refers to acute or subacute arthritis in association with, or as a reaction to, an enteric (usually colonic) inflammatory condition.

Causes and associations
 Reactive arthritis (Reactive to enteric infection)
 Spondyloarthropathies associated with inflammatory bowel disease (Crohn's disease and ulcerative colitis)
 Malabsorption related:
Intestinal bypass (jejunoileal)
Celiac disease
Whipple's disease
 Collagenous colitis

Note that reactive arthritis can also occur secondary to urethral infection. In that case, the term enteropathic arthropathy would not be used.

See also
Enteropathy
Arthropathy

References

Infectious arthropathies
Inflammatory polyarthropathies
Arthritis